Color Line Stadion is an association football stadium in Ålesund, Norway, and the home of 1. divisjon side Aalesunds FK. It was inaugurated in April 2005 and cost NOK 160 million to build. It is referred to as Aalesund Stadion by UEFA, as naming rights arrangements (in this case, with ferry operator Color Line) is not included during UEFA competitions.

It was the first top-level stadium in Norway to feature artificial turf, which was at the time a highly debated issue. When Aalesund opened the stadium, businessman Olav Nils Sunde donated a statue to the club, which was erected in front of the stadium. Whilst Sunde denied it, the statue bore a very strong resemblance to former Aalesund player John Arne Riise. In 2007, when Riise played in the Champions League Final, a Norwegian commentator demanded the statue officially carry his name. Riise himself has said, "[The name change] is not for me to decide. Everyone sees who it is, and I know that it was made for me." It was officially named "John Arne Riise" in April 2018.

Since 2009 it has also hosted the home games of the women's Toppserien side Fortuna Ålesund. The venue has hosted one Norway national under-21 football team match, playing 1–3 against Cyprus on 3 September 2010. In a 2012 survey carried out by the Norwegian Players' Association among away-team captains, Color Line Stadion was ranked eleventh amongst league stadiums, with a score of 2.87 on a scale from one to five.

Facts

Capacity: 10,778 (9,598 seated).
Record attendance: 10,903 (vs Hamarkameratene, 2005).
The first match Aafk played on Color Line Stadium was against Odd Grenland. Aalesund won the match.
Outside the stadium is a statue of John Arne Riise, modeled after the former Aalesund player. Until April 2018, the statue was named «The football player».

Attendance

References

External links

 Official website

Football venues in Norway
Eliteserien venues
Sports venues completed in 2005
2005 establishments in Norway
Sports venues in Ålesund
Color Line (ferry operator)
Aalesunds FK